Dorothy Lee  "Dotsie"  Bausch is an American cyclist, Olympic silver medalist, advocate, speaker, and the executive director of the nonprofit, Switch4Good.  She is the founder of two nonprofits.

Early life
Bausch grew up in Kentucky and graduated from Villanova University with a degree in journalism.

At 26 years old, toward the end of her therapy work, her therapist encouraged her to move her body again, choosing a physical activity that was not attached to a goal of fitness or weight loss. She chose cycling.

Careers
Bausch was featured in the 2015 documentary Personal Gold: An Underdog Story and the 2017 documentary The Game Changers.

Switch4Good is an athlete-driven nonprofit working toward a dairy-free future. The organization employs athlete stories with scientific research and outreach to help others "live better and do more" by avoiding dairy.

References

External links

 

American female cyclists
Cyclists at the 2012 Summer Olympics
Olympic silver medalists for the United States in cycling
Living people
Villanova University alumni
Year of birth missing (living people)
21st-century American women